CREB/ATF bZIP transcription factor is a protein that in humans is encoded by the CREBZF gene.

References

Further reading